Staraya Golovinka is a rural locality in Verkhnelyubazhsky Selsoviet Rural Settlement, Fatezhsky District, Kursk Oblast, Russia. Population:

Geography 
The village is located on the Svapa River (a right tributary of the Seym River), 105 km from the Russia–Ukraine border, 66 km north-west of Kursk, 21 km north-west of the district center – the town Fatezh, 7.5 km from the selsoviet center – Verkhny Lyubazh.

 Climate
Staraya Golovinka has a warm-summer humid continental climate (Dfb in the Köppen climate classification).

Transport 
Staraya Golovinka is located 3.5 km from the federal route  Crimea Highway (a part of the European route ), 20 km from the route  (a part of the European route ), 1.5 km from the road of intermunicipal significance  (M2 "Crimea Highway" – Yasenok), 22.5 km from the nearest railway station Kurbakinskaya (railway line Arbuzovo – Luzhki-Orlovskiye).

The rural locality is situated 68 km from Kursk Vostochny Airport, 188 km from Belgorod International Airport and 242 km from Voronezh Peter the Great Airport.

References

Notes

Sources

Rural localities in Fatezhsky District